Kassai  is the surname of the following people:
Ervin Kassai (1925–2012), Hungarian basketball referee
Fernander Kassaï (born 1987), Central African footballer 
Hassan Kassai (1928–2012), Iranian classical musician 
István Kassai (born 1959), Hungarian pianist 
Lajos Kassai (born 1960), Hungarian archer
Viktor Kassai (born 1975), Hungarian football referee

See also
Kasai (surname)

Hungarian-language surnames